Calgary Confederation is a federal electoral district in Alberta, Canada, that has been represented in the House of Commons of Canada since 2015. It was created in 2012 from the electoral districts of Calgary Centre-North (70%), Calgary West (23%) and Calgary—Nose Hill (8%).

Members of Parliament
This riding has elected the following members of the House of Commons of Canada:

Election results

References

Alberta federal electoral districts
Politics of Calgary